Grouping may refer to:

 Muenchian grouping
 Principles of grouping
 Railways Act 1921, also known as Grouping Act, a reorganisation of the British railway system
 Grouping (firearms), the pattern of multiple shots from a sidearm

See also 
 
 Deutsch's scale illusion
 Argument map
 Concept map
 Mind map
 MECE principle
 Principle of abstraction
 Group (disambiguation)